Bletchley and Fenny Stratford is a civil parish with a town council, in Milton Keynes, Buckinghamshire, England. It was formed in 2001 from the unparished area of Milton Keynes, and according to the 2011 census had a population of 15,313. Together with West Bletchley, it forms the Bletchley built-up area.

The parish includes Brickfields (includes the Blue Lagoon), Central Bletchley (that is, Bletchley east of the West Coast Main Line), Denbigh (Denbigh North, Denbigh East and Denbigh West), Fenny Stratford, Fenny Lock, Granby, Mount Farm and Water Eaton (includes "Lakes Estate").

Central Bletchley
Originally, Bletchley was exclusively west of the railway line (which is why the station faces that way) and was centred on St. Mary's Church (Church of England), Bletchley Park, and the Freeman Memorial Methodist chapel on Buckingham Road. This area is now known as "Old Bletchley",  Another settlement was situated between the crossroads of Shenley Road, Newton Road, and Buckingham Road, and the T-junction of Tattenhoe Lane and Buckingham Road. By 1926, this had become known as "Far Bletchley".

However, as Bletchley developed, a new centre grew up around Bletchley Road (the road from Fenny Stratford to [Old] Bletchley). The new settlement became known as "Central Bletchley", distinguishing it from Old Bletchley and Far Bletchley, and from the later development of West Bletchley, which embraced these two. In 1966, after a Royal Visit, Bletchley Urban District Council renamed Bletchley Road as "Queensway".

Central Bletchley is bordered by the West Coast Main Line to the west, the Water Eaton Brook and Water Eaton Road to the south, North Street and Bletchley Leisure Centre to the North and Knowles School/Leon Recreational Ground to the East. The dividing line between Central Bletchley and Fenny Stratford is largely a notional one.

Denbigh

For many years, Denbigh has been an important employment area: perhaps its most famous resident is Marshall Amplification.

In 2005, large commercial developments occurred on the immediate outskirts of Bletchley, although still in the civil parish of Bletchley and Fenny Stratford. The supermarket chain Asda-Wal-Mart and the Swedish furniture retailer IKEA built and opened large stores at Denbigh North, northeast of the town centre on Watling Street, and Tesco responded by expanding its Fenny Stratford store (also on Watling Street). Whether or not these new developments accelerate the decline of the town centre remains to be seen.

This same area of development is also home to the new stadium:mk for Milton Keynes Dons F.C. Many away fans will arrive via Bletchley railway station, and this may bring some added business to the town on their way to the ground.

Brickfields

The Blue Lagoon

 Bletchley is home to the only Local Nature Reserve in the City of Milton Keynes, the Blue Lagoon, which attracts many local visitors every day. School children in Bletchley are often taken on trips to learn about the history of this site.

Water Eaton
Water Eaton is a small village to the south of Fenny Stratford, which was absorbed by Bletchley and Fenny Stratford, before the latter in turn   became part of Milton Keynes. The village was first mentioned in the Domesday book of 1086 and was simply called Eaton and was the home of Geoffrey de Montbray and listed as a mill.

The Lakes Estate, south of Bletchley was the last London overspill estate to be built by the Greater London Council. It took some time to build – beginning in about 1970 and not being fully completed until 1975."

The Lakes Estate is bordered by Drayton road to the North and West, Stoke road to the East and Lomond drive to the south.

City Council ward
In City Council elections, the parish is divided into the wards of Bletchley Park, Bletchley West and Bletchley East.

See also
 West Bletchley civil parish
 Bletchley, Milton Keynes
 Fenny Stratford

References

External links
Town Council
"Bletchley Pioneers, Planning & Progress". Oral history collected by Knowles Middle School parents Clutch Club describe the post-war expansion of Bletchley by migrants from London.

External links
'Parishes : Bletchley with Fenny Stratford and Water Eaton' – Victoria History of the Counties of England, A History of the County of Buckingham: Volume 4 (1927), pp. 274–283.

Civil parishes in Buckinghamshire
Milton Keynes